The 1954 Polish Speedway season was the 1954 season of motorcycle speedway in Poland.

Individual

Polish Individual Speedway Championship
The 1954 Individual Speedway Polish Championship was held over five legs.

Wrocław, 30 May 
Katowice, 20 June 
Leszno, 8 August
Bydgoszcz, 3 October
Warsawa, 17 October

Team

Team Speedway Polish Championship
The 1954 Team Speedway Polish Championship was the seventh edition of the Team Polish Championship.

Rules

In First League, matches were played with part two teams, with it playing it matches return.  Teams were made up of six drivers plus two reserves. The score of heat: 3–2–1–0.  Mecz consisted of 9 heats.  For winning a game a team received 2 points, draw – 1 point, loss – 0 points.  The drivers from main squads started in match three times.  The quantity of small points was added up.

First League 

Medalists

References

Poland Individual
Poland Team
Speedway